Antonio Daniel Barijho (born 18 March 1977 in Buenos Aires) is a former Argentine football striker.

Club career
Barijho started his career with Huracán in 1992, he left the club in 1998 and returned in 2007.

The most successful part of his career was his first spell with Boca Juniors between 1998 and 2002 where he won six major titles, including two Copa Libertadores and three Primera División Argentina titles.

In 2002, he moved to Switzerland to play for Grasshopper Club Zürich in Switzerland where he was part of the 2002-2003 Swiss Super League winning squad. At the end of the season he returned to Boca and won one further league title. he played a total of 102 games for Boca in all competitions scoring 45 goals.

Nicknamed "Chipi", Barijho has also played football for Banfield and Independiente in Argentina, FC Saturn Moscow Oblast in Russia and Barcelona SC in Ecuador.

After one year of retirement, Barijho accepted a deal to play with recently promoted Deportivo Merlo at the Primera B Nacional.

Coaching career
After his retirement, Barijho started his coaching career as a youth coach at Club Peñarol Argentino in Bajo Flores, near to where he lived with his family. At the end of 2014 it was confirmed, that 

In February 2019, he was hired as a youth coach at Boca Juniors.

National titles

International titles

References

External links
 Argentine Primera statistics at Fútbol XXI  

1977 births
Living people
Footballers from Buenos Aires
Argentine footballers
Association football forwards
Club Atlético Huracán footballers
Boca Juniors footballers
Grasshopper Club Zürich players
FC Saturn Ramenskoye players
Club Atlético Banfield footballers
Barcelona S.C. footballers
Club Atlético Independiente footballers
Argentine Primera División players
Russian Premier League players
Swiss Super League players
Expatriate footballers in Switzerland
Expatriate footballers in Russia
Expatriate footballers in Ecuador
Argentine expatriate footballers
Argentine expatriate sportspeople in Russia